Pseudocnus is a genus of sea cucumbers in the family Cucumariidae.

Species
The following species are recognised in the genus Pseudocnus:
Pseudocnus alcocki (Koehler & Vaney, 1908)
Pseudocnus californicus (Semper, 1868)
Pseudocnus curatus (Cowles, 1907)
Pseudocnus dubiosus (Semper, 1868)
Pseudocnus echinatus (von Marenzeller, 1881)
Pseudocnus grubii (von Marenzeller, 1874)
Pseudocnus koellikeri (Semper, 1868)
Pseudocnus lamperti (Ohshima, 1915)
Pseudocnus lubricus (Clark, 1901)
Pseudocnus pawsoni Won & Rho, 1998
Pseudocnus rhopalodiformis (Heding, 1943)
Pseudocnus rugosus Cherbonnier, 1957
Pseudocnus sentus O'Loughlin & Alcock, 2000
Pseudocnus spinosus (Ohshima, 1915)
Pseudocnus thandari Moodley, 2008

References

Cucumariidae
Holothuroidea genera